Western Thailand  is a region of Thailand bordering Myanmar on the west, Southern Thailand on the south, and central Thailand on the east.

Geography
Thailand's long mountainous border with Myanmar continues south from northern Thailand into western Thailand following the Tenasserim Hills. This narrow region stretches from Bangkok's outer reaches to the border with Myanmar and from the Shan Hills in the north to Chumphon Province in the south.

The geography of the western region is characterised by high mountains and steep river valleys. Western Thailand hosts much of Thailand's less-disturbed forest areas. Water and minerals are important natural resources. The region is home to many of the country's major dams, and mining is an important industry. Many village names in western Thailand rely heavily on the physical geography of the region.

Provinces of western Thailand
According to the six geographical regions established by the National Research Council of Thailand, the western region includes the following provinces:
Kanchanaburi (กาญจนบุรี)
Phetchaburi (เพชรบุรี)
Prachuap Khiri Khan (ประจวบคีรีขันธ์)
Ratchaburi (ราชบุรี)
Tak (ตาก)

Economy
For economic statistics of Western Thailand, Suphan Buri and Samut Songkhram provinces are listed by National Statistical Office (Thailand). However Tak Province is listed by (lower) Northern Thailand.
For FY 2018, Western Thailand Region had a combined economic output of 579.815 billion baht (US$18.7 billion), or 3.5 percent of Thailand's GDP. Ratchaburi province had an economic output of 189.68 billion baht (US$6.12 billion). This amounts to a GPP per capita of 233,258 baht (US$7,524), more than double for Suphan Buri province, lowest in the ranking.

Weather forecast
Kanchanaburi, Ratchaburi, Suphan Buri and Samut Songkhram provinces have been added to the central region by Thai Meteorological Department (TMD).
Petchaburi and Prachuap Khiri Khan provinces are part of the southern region (east coast).

See also
Regions of Thailand
Tenasserim Hills

References

Regions of Thailand